Curino is a comune (municipality) in the Province of Biella in the Italian region Piedmont, located about  northeast of Turin and about  northeast of Biella.

Curino borders the following municipalities: Brusnengo, Casapinta, Crevacuore, Masserano, Mezzana Mortigliengo, Pray, Roasio, Soprana, Sostegno, Trivero, Villa del Bosco.

Population

References

Cities and towns in Piedmont